Paul Clement Kemp (February 9, 1931 – July 26, 2014) was an American football player, coach, and scout. He served as the head football coach at Dickinson State College—now known as Dickinson State University—in 1956 and at the Boston University from 1973 to 1976, compiling a career college football record of 20–26–1.  From 1951 to 1953, Kemp played quarterback at the University of Iowa, where he was a member of the Iowa Beta chapter of Sigma Alpha Epsilon fraternity.

Kemp was born on February 9, 1931, in Waterloo, Iowa. He died of pulmonary hypertension and leukemia, on July 26, 2014, in Lexington, Kentucky.

Head coaching record

References

External links
 

1931 births
2014 deaths
American football quarterbacks
Atlanta Falcons scouts
Arizona State Sun Devils football coaches
Ball State Cardinals football coaches
Boston University Terriers football coaches
Dickinson State Blue Hawks football coaches
Iowa Hawkeyes football coaches
Iowa Hawkeyes football players
Iowa State Cyclones football coaches
Pittsburgh Panthers football coaches
Sportspeople from Waterloo, Iowa
Coaches of American football from Iowa
Players of American football from Iowa